A monopoly is a situation in which there is only one provider of a specific good or service.

Monopoly may also refer to:

Games 
 Monopoly (game), a property trading board game
 Monopoly (game show), an American TV series
 Monopoly video games, several adaptations of the board game
 Monopoly: The Card Game, a card game loosely based on the board game

Video games 
 Monopoly (1985 video game)
 Monopoly (1988 video game)
 Monopoly (1991 video game)
 Monopoly (1995 video game)
 Monopoly (1997 video game)
 Monopoly (1999 video game)
 Monopoly (2000 video game)

People 
 Alec Monopoly (born 1980s), American street artist
 John Monopoly, an early manager for Kanye West
 Tony Monopoly (1944–1995), Australian singer and actor

Other uses 
 Monopoly (cereal), a breakfast food based on Cinnamon Toast Crunch
 Monopoly (McDonald's), a McDonald's sales promotion using the theme of board game Monopoly
 Monopoly money, the play money used in the board game, or any worthless currency
 Monopoly (Tuks album), 2009
 Monopoly (wine), an area controlled by a single winery
 "Monopoly" (song), 2019 song by Ariana Grande and Victoria Monét

See also 
 Monopole (disambiguation)
 Monopoli (disambiguation)
 Monopolist (board game)
 Monopoly game (disambiguation)